The 2022 Morehead State Eagles football team represented Morehead State University as a member of the Pioneer Football League (PFL) during the 2022 NCAA Division I FCS football season. The Eagles were led by tenth-year head coach Rob Tenyer and played their home games at Jayne Stadium.

Previous season

The Eagles finished the 2021 season with a record 7–4, 6–2 in PFL play to finish in a tie for third place.

Schedule

Game summaries

at No. 23 Mercer

at No. 4 Montana State

Kentucky Christian

at Stetson

Presbyterian

at Davidson

Valparaiso

at Butler

Marist

at Dayton

San Diego

References

Morehead State
Morehead State Eagles football seasons
Morehead State Eagles football